Hasan-i Sabbāh or Hassan as-Sabbāh (full name: Hassan bin Ali bin Muhammad bin Ja'far bin al-Husayn bin Muhammad bin al-Sabbah al-Himyari; c. 1050 – 12 June 1124) was the founder of the Nizari Isma'ili state and its fidā'i military group known as the Order of Assassins, often referred also as the Hashshashin. Since Marco Polo, he has been known in the West as the Old Man of the Mountain. He later seized a mountain fortress called Alamut.

Sources
Hasan is thought to have written an autobiography, which did not survive but seems to underlie the first part of an anonymous Isma'ili biography entitled Sargozasht-e Seyyednā. The latter is known only from quotations made by later Persian authors. Hasan also wrote a treatise, in Persian, on the doctrine of ta'līm, called, al-Fusul al-arba'a The text is no longer in existence, but fragments are cited or paraphrased by al-Shahrastānī and several Persian historians.

Early life and conversion

Qom and Rayy

The possibly autobiographical information found in Sargozasht-i Seyyednā is the main source for Hasan's background and early life. According to this, Hasan-i Sabbāh was born in the city of Qom, Persia in the 1050s to a family of Twelver Shia. His father, a Kufan Arab reportedly of Yemenite origins, had left the Sawād of Kufa (located in modern Iraq) to settle in the town of Qom, one of the first centres of Arab settlement in Persia and a stronghold of Twelver Shia.

Early in his life, his family moved to Rayy. Rayy was a city that had a history of radical Islamic thought since the 9th century, with Hamdan Qarmaṭ as one of its teachers.

It was in this religious centre that Hasan developed a keen interest in metaphysical matters and adhered to the Twelver code of instruction. During the day he studied at home, and mastered palmistry, languages, philosophy, astronomy and mathematics (especially geometry).

Rayy was also the home of Ismā‘īlī missionaries in the Jibal. At the time, Isma'ilism was a growing movement in Persia and other lands east of Egypt. The Persian Isma'ilis supported the da'wa ("mission") directed by the Fatimid caliphate of Cairo and recognized the authority of the Imam-Caliph al-Mustanṣir (d. 1094), though Isfahan, rather than Cairo, may have functioned as their principal headquarters. The Ismā'īlī mission worked on three layers: the lowest was the fida'i or foot soldier, followed by the rafīk or comrade, and finally the dā‘ī or missionary. It has been suggested that the popularity of the Ismā'īlī religion in Persia was due to the people's dissatisfaction with the Seljuk rulers, who had recently removed local rulers.

Conversion to Ismailism and training in Cairo
At the age of 17, Hasan converted and swore allegiance to the Fatimid caliph in Cairo. Hasan's studies did not end with his crossing over. He further studied under two other dā‘iyyayn, and as he proceeded on his path, he was looked upon with eyes of respect.

Hasan's austere and devoted commitment to the da'wa brought him in audience with the chief missionary of the region: 'Abdu l-Malik ibn Attash. Ibn Attash, suitably impressed with the young seventeen-year-old Hasan, made him Deputy Missionary and advised him to go to Cairo to further his studies.

However, Hasan did not initially travel to Cairo. Some historians have postulated that Hasan, following his conversion, was playing host to some members of the Fatimid caliphate, and this was leaked to the anti-Fatimid and anti-Shī‘a vizier Nizam al-Mulk. This prompted his abandoning Rayy and heading to Cairo in 1076.

Hasan took about 2 years to reach Cairo. Along the way he toured many other regions that did not fall in the general direction of Egypt. Isfahan was the first city that he visited. He was hosted by one of the Missionaries of his youth, a man who had taught the youthful Hasan in Rayy. His name was Resi Abufasl and he further instructed Hasan.

From here he went to Arran (current Azerbaijan), hundreds of miles to the north, and from there through Armenia. Here he attracted the ire of priests following a heated discussion, and Hasan was thrown out of the town he was in.

He then turned south and traveled through Iraq, reached Damascus in Syria. He left for Egypt from Palestine. Records exist, some in the fragmentary remains of his autobiography, and from another biography written by Rashid-al-Din Hamadani in 1310, to date his arrival in Egypt at 30 August 1078.

It is unclear how long Hasan stayed in Egypt: about 3 years is the usually accepted amount of time. He continued his studies here, and became a full missionary.

Return to Persia
Whilst he was in Cairo, studying and preaching, he incurred the displeasure of the Chief of the Army, Badr al-Jamalī. This may have been a result of the fact that Hasan supported Nizar, the Ismaili Imam-Caliph al-Mustanṣir's elder son, as the next Imam. Hasan was briefly imprisoned by Badr al-Jamali. The collapse of a minaret of the jail was taken to be an omen in favor of Hasan and he was promptly released and deported. The ship that he was traveling on was wrecked. He was rescued and taken to Syria. Traveling via Aleppo and Baghdad, he terminated his journey at Isfahan in 1081.

Hasan's life now was totally devoted to the mission. Hasan toured extensively throughout Persia. In northern Persia, touching the south shore of the Caspian Sea, are the mountains of Alborz. These mountains were home to a people who had traditionally resisted attempts by both Arabs and Turkish subjugation; this place was also a home of Shia leaning. The news of this Ismā'īlī's activities reached Nizam al-Mulk, who dispatched his soldiers with the orders for Hasan's capture. Hasan evaded them, and went deeper into the mountains.

Capture of Alamut

His search for a base from which to guide his mission ended when in 1088 he found the castle of Alamut in the Rudbar area (modern Qazvin, Iran). It was a fort that stood guard over a valley that was about fifty kilometers long and five kilometers wide. This fortress had been built about the year 865; legend has it that it was built by a king who saw his eagle fly up to and perch upon a rock, a propitious omen, the importance of which this king, Wah Sudan ibn Marzuban, understood. Likening the perching of the eagle to a lesson given by it, he called the fort Aluh Amu(kh)t: the "Eagles' Teaching".

Hasan's takeover of the fort was conducted without any significant bloodshed. To effect this transition Hasan employed a patient and deliberate strategy, one which took the better part of two years to effect. First Hasan sent his Daʻiyyīn and Rafīks to win over the villages in the valley, and their inhabitants. Next, key people amongst this populace were converted, and finally, in 1090, Hasan took over the fort by infiltrating it with his converts. Hasan gave the former owner a draft drawn on the name of a wealthy landlord and told him to obtain the promised money from this man; when the landlord saw the draft with Hasan's signature, he immediately paid the amount to the fort's owner, astonishing him. Another, probably apocryphal version of the takeover states that Hasan offered 3000 gold dinars to the fort's owner for the amount of land that would fit a buffalo's hide. The terms having been agreed upon, Hasan cut the hide into strips and linked them into a large ring around the perimeter of the fort, whose owner was thus undone by his own greed.

While legend holds that after capturing Alamut Hasan thereafter devoted himself so faithfully to study that in the nearly 35 years he was there he never left his quarters, excepting only two times when he went up to the roof, this reported isolation is highly doubtful, given his extensive recruiting and organizational involvement in the growing Ismā'īlī insurrections in Persia and Syria. Nonetheless, Hasan was highly educated and was known for austerity, studying, translating, praying, fasting, and directing the activities of the Daʻwa: the propagation of the Nizarī doctrine was headquartered at Alamut. He knew the Qur'ān by heart, could quote extensively from the texts of most Muslim sects, and apart from philosophy, was well versed in mathematics, astronomy, alchemy, medicine, architecture, and the major scientific disciplines of his time. In a major departure from tradition, Hasan declared Persian to be the language of holy literature for Nizaris, a decision that resulted in all the Nizari Ismā'īlī literature from Persia, Syria, Afghanistan and Central Asia to be transcribed in Persian for several centuries.

Foreign views: Marco Polo and China

Hasan, the founder of Nizari Isma'ilis in Persia, was designated by Marco Polo using a Syrian equivalent term known in Europe at that time, as Elder or Old Man of the Mountain. Polo's travelogue (ca. 1300) describes Hasan as a charlatan who devised plots to convert young men to his sect. At the court of the Old Man of the Mountain "they were educated in various languages and customs, courtly etiquette, and trained in martial and other skills". At Alamut they had "impressive libraries whose collections included books on various religious traditions, philosophical and scientific texts, and scientific equipment".

Xishiji, a Chinese manuscript completed in 1263, relates a story similar to that of Polo. The sect leaders "ordered to send assassins to hide in those kingdoms which did not surrender. They stabbed their lords, and women as well, and they died".

Nizari doctrine
Historians and scholars identify Hasan-i Sabbah as the founder of the Nizari Assassins and their doctrine. It developed during the struggle for succession of Nizar to the Fatimid throne in Cairo that eventually laid the foundation of the Nizari Isma'ilism Shia Islam. Since then, as a basic element of conservative nature, the Ismaili Imamate includes a hidden imam, in addition to the visible (or hazar, meaning apparent) imam of the time, acting as such in a community. An important task of the latter is the proliferation of the doctrine, and of the undisclosed imam's spiritual guidance, in learning centers having instructors proficient in teaching techniques.

Devotion of the "true believers" having "absolute faith" in the beliefs is another element originating from the times of Sabbah in Northern Iran, who reportedly "was so devout that he even had one of his sons executed after he was accused of drunkenness".

A Nizari assassin is identified as fida'i or devotee, "who offers his life for others or in the service of a particular cause".

Personal life
Hasan is known for his ascetic and austere religious lifestyle. He reportedly left his living quarters in the Alamut Castle only twice to ascend the rooftop.

Hasan-i Sabbah probably had one wife, two daughters, and two sons. Hasan's wife and daughters were sent to Gerdkuh as a safe place during Shirgir's campaign against Alamut; they never returned. They lived on spinning.

In popular culture
 Betty Bouthoul published a popular book in French titled Le grand maître des assassins (Master of the Assassins) about Hasan-i Sabbāh in 1936.
 A 1938 novel named Alamut by Vladimir Bartol is based on Hasan's rise to power.
The British "space rock" group Hawkwind has a song called "Hassan I Sahba" on its 1977 album, Quark, Strangeness and Charm.
 Hasan-i Sabbāh is mentioned, often by his moniker 'The Old Man of the Mountain', in many of William S. Burroughs's novels, including Nova Express, Cities of the Red Night, The Place of Dead Roads and The Western Lands. According to Barry Miles book The Beat Hotel Burroughs was introduced to Hasan through Betty Bouthoul's book while staying in Paris, France.
He is portrayed in the Turkish TV series Uyanış: Büyük Selçuklu by Gürkan Uygun.

See also
 Firdaws-i Bareen
 Aga Khan IV

References

Citations

Sources

Further reading

Secondary sources
 Daftary, Farhad, A Short History of the Ismā'īlīs. Edinburgh: Edinburgh University Press, 1998.
 Daftary, Farhad, The Assassin Legends: Myths of the Ismā'īlīs. London: I.B. Tauris & Co. Ltd, 1994. Reviewed by Babak Nahid at Ismaili.net
 Daftary, Farhad, "Hasan-i Sabbāh and the Origins of the Nizārī Ismā'īlī movement." In Mediaeval Ismā'īlī History and Thought, ed. Farhad Daftary. Cambridge: Cambridge University Press, 1996. 181–204.
 Hodgson, Marshall, The Order of Assassins. The Struggle of the Early Nizārī Ismā'īlī Against the Islamic World. The Hague: Mouton, 1955.
 Hodgson, Marshall, "The Ismā'īlī State." In The Cambridge History of Iran, vol. 5: The Saljuq and Mongol Periods, ed. J.A. Boyle. Cambridge: Cambridge University Press, 1968. 422–82.
 
 Lewis, Bernard, The Assassins. A Radical Sect in Islam. New York: Basic Books, 1968.
 Madelung, Wilferd, Religious Trends in Early Islamic Iran. Albany: Bibliotheca Persica, 1988. 101–5.

Primary sources
 Hasan-i Sabbah, al-Fuṣūl al-arba'a ("The Four Chapters"), tr. Marshall G.S. Hodgson, in Ismaili Literature Anthology. A Shi'i Vision of Islam, ed. Hermann Landolt, Samira Sheikh and Kutub Kassam. London, 2008. pp. 149–52. Persian treatise on the doctrine of ta'līm. The text is no longer extant, but fragments are cited or paraphrased by al-Shahrastānī and several Persian historians.
 Sarguzasht-e Sayyidnā

External links
 HASAN BIN SABBAH AND NIZARI ISMAILI STATE IN ALAMUT
 The life of Hasan-i-Sabbah as part of an online book on the Assassins of Alamut.
 Arkon Daraul on Hasan-i-Sabbah.
 An illustrated article on the Order of Assassins.
 William S. Burrough's invocation of Hasan-i-Sabbah in Nova Express.
 Assassins entry in the Encyclopedia of the Orient. 
 Review of the book, "The Assassin Legends: Myths of the Isma'ilis (I. B. Tauris & Co. Ltd: London, 1994), 213 pp." by Babak Nahid, Department of Comparative Literature, University of California, Los Angeles
 Ismaili Imams and their Love for Knowledge. Islamic Publications Limited

1050s births
1124 deaths
11th-century Ismailis
12th-century Ismailis
Cult leaders
Medieval legends
People from Alamut
People from Qom
Prisoners and detainees of the Fatimid Caliphate
People of the Nizari–Seljuk wars
11th-century Arabs
12th-century Arabs